The Stradal House, on N. 13th St. in Wa Keeney in Trego County, Kansas is a Lustron house which was listed on the National Register of Historic Places in 2001.

It is a one-story  house on a concrete slab foundationo, built by Dreiling Implements of Hays, Kansas for John and Agnes Stradal.

It is an example of Lustron's two-bedroom Westchester Deluxe Plan model.  As with other pre-fabricated Lustron models, it included built-in cabinets and bookshelves, and had exterior steel panels.  In this example the exterior panels are "desert tan with white trim."

It was deemed worthy of NRHP listing "for its architecture and its significance as one of only a hundred Lustron houses extant in Kansas at the time of nomination."

It was listed on the National Register as part of a multiple property submission of Lustron houses in Kansas.

References

External links

National Register of Historic Places in Trego County, Kansas
Buildings and structures completed in 1950
Lustron houses in Kansas
Lustron houses